Listed buildings in Silverdale may refer to:
 Listed buildings in Silverdale, Lancashire
 Listed buildings in Silverdale, Staffordshire